Sérgio Machado (born 19 September 1968) is a Brazilian film director and screenwriter. His film Cidade Baixa was screened in the Un Certain Regard section at the 2005 Cannes Film Festival.

Filmography
 Onde a Terra Acaba (2001; director; documentary)
 3 Histórias da Bahia (2001; director)
 Behind the Sun (2001; writer)
 Madame Satã (2002; writer)
 Lower City (2005; director)
 The Two Deaths of Quincas Wateryell (2009; director)
 A Coleção Invisível (2013; writer)

References

External links

1968 births
Living people
Brazilian film directors
Brazilian screenwriters